Edward Winter may refer to:

 Edward Winter (English administrator) (1622–1686), English administrator employed by the East India Company
 Edward Winter (actor) (1937–2001), American actor
 Edward Winter (chess historian) (born 1955), English journalist, historian and author about the game of chess
 Edward Winter (cricketer) (1773–1830), English cricketer
 Edward Winter (tennis) (born 2004), Australian tennis player
 H. Edward Winter (1908–1976), American enamelist
 Edward Henry Winter (1879–1941), American politician and newspaper publisher from Missouri

See also
 Ed Wynter (1904–1974), rugby league footballer